Carlos Rodrigo Tejas Pastén (born October 4, 1971) is a Chilean former professional footballer who played as a goalkeeper.

International career
Tejas was in Chile's squad for the 1997 Copa América and 1998 FIFA World Cup. In addition, he played for Chile B against England B on February 10, 1998. Chile won by 2–1.

Personal life
He is the father of Carla Tejas, who played for Chile U17 (women) as a goalkeeper just like him.

Honours

Club
Cobreloa
 Primera División de Chile (2): 2003–A, 2003–C

References

1971 births
Living people
People from Iquique
Chilean footballers
Chile international footballers
Coquimbo Unido footballers
Santiago Morning footballers
Cobreloa footballers
Deportes La Serena footballers
O'Higgins F.C. footballers
Chilean Primera División players
Primera B de Chile players
1998 FIFA World Cup players
Association football goalkeepers
People from Iquique Province
People from Tarapacá Region